Dorph is a surname. Notable people with the surname include: 

Anton Dorph (1831–1914), Danish painter
Bertha Dorph (1875–1960), Danish painter
Birgitta Karlström Dorph (born 1939), Swedish diplomat
Christian Dorph (born 1966), Danish author
Niels Dorph (1681–1758), Danish/Norwegian clergyman
Viggo Dorph-Petersen (1851–1937), Danish architect